Praepodes elegans is a species of weevils. It is found in Cuba.

References

External links 

 

Curculionidae
Beetles described in 1847
Fauna of Cuba
Endemic fauna of Cuba